The Greatest is a compilation album by Australian rock band Mondo Rock, originally released on 15 November 2004 by Sony Music Australia.

The album was re-released in 2017 under the title The Greatest Hits by Liberation Music.

Background 
Mondo Rock were formed in 1976 by mainstay singer-songwriter, Ross Wilson. The band released 6 studio albums between 1979 and 1990. The group had ten top 40 singles and was one of the most popular acts in Australia during the early 1980s.

Track listing

Release history

References 

2004 compilation albums
Mondo Rock albums
Compilation albums by Australian artists
Sony Music Australia compilation albums
Albums produced by John L Sayers